Jean K. Burling is an American attorney and former judge. She was the first woman to be a judge in the state of New Hampshire.

Early life and education
Burling was the 47th woman admitted to practice law in New Hampshire.

Legal career
Burling became New Hampshire's first female judge in 1973. She served as a superior court justice on the New Hampshire Superior Court of Grafton County. Citing health reasons, she retired on January 1, 2008.

See also
 List of first women lawyers and judges in New Hampshire

References

20th-century American women lawyers
20th-century American lawyers
Women judges